The tiny scaled gecko (Lygodactylus bivittis) is a species of lizard in the family Gekkonidae. The species is endemic to Madagascar.

Taxonomy
L. bivittis was formerly placed in a monotypic genus Microscalabotes. However, molecular data suggested that Microscalabotes is nested within Lygodactylus, and the genus was synonymized.

Habitat and behavior
It is diurnal and lives in trees. It does not occur in heavily degraded areas and is threatened by the loss and degradation of humid forests in eastern Madagascar.

Reproduction
L. bivittis is oviparous.

References

Further reading
Glaw F, Vences M (2006). A Field Guide to Amphibians and Reptiles of Madagascar, Third Edition. Cologne, Germany: Vences & Glaw Verlag. 496 pp. . (Microscalabotes bivittis).
Peters W (1883). "Neue Geckonen, darunter drei Arten von Scalabotes, aus der Sammlung des in Madasascar verstorbenen Reisenden J. M. Hildebrandt ". Sitzungs-Berichte der Gesellschaft Naturforschender Freunde zu Berlin 1883: 27–29. (Scalabotes bivittis, new species, p. 28; S. hildebrandti, new species, p. 28). (in German).
Rösler H (2000). "Kommentierte Liste der rezent, subrezent und fossil bekannten Geckotaxa (Reptilia: Gekkonomorpha)". Gekkota 2: 28–153. (Microscalabotes bivittis, p. 132). (in German).

Lygodactylus
Endemic fauna of Madagascar
Reptiles of Madagascar
Taxa named by Wilhelm Peters
Reptiles described in 1883